Kabir Kouh Tunnel is an ongoing road tunnel project in Ilam Province, Iran. The tunnel passes under the Kabir Kouh range connecting the counties of Darreh Shahr and Abdanan, shortening the current  mountain pass to about 6 km. The range acts as a barrier between the province's western areas such as Abdanan and border cities of Mehran and Dehloran with the country's internal road networks. 

The project consists of a  main tunnel and eight other shorter tunnels with a total length of  connecting the Darreh Shahr-Pole Dokhtar route to the main tunnel.

The construction of the tunnel started in May 2010 and was planned to be opened in four years. As of August 2019, the main and connecting tunnels have been dug but the project is yet to be completed.

References

Tunnels in Iran
Transport buildings and structures in Iran